Kenneth John Conant (June 28, 1894 – March 3, 1984) was an American architectural historian and educator, who specialized in medieval architecture. Conant is known for his studies of Cluny Abbey.

Career
Born in Neenah, Conant received a Bachelor of Arts in Fine Arts from Harvard University in 1915. He was considered the academic heir of Herbert Langford Warren, a teacher at Harvard, and through him, of the art historians Charles Eliot Norton and John Ruskin. He served in the 42nd Infantry Division of the American Expeditionary Force in World War I and was wounded in the Second Battle of the Marne in 1918. Conant later returned to Harvard. His dissertation on the Santiago de Compostela Cathedral was published as a monograph in 1926.  
 
Conant's lifework was the study of the Cluny Abbey in France, which he excavated beginning in 1927, funded by his first of five separate Guggenheim Fellowships. He considered Cluny the preeminent accomplishment in all of architectural history.

Conant was an elected member of both the American Academy of Arts and Sciences and the American Philosophical Society. He taught architectural history at Harvard from 1924 to 1955, the year of his retirement.

Legacy
In 1916, Denman Ross painted a portrait of Conant, now in the Harvard Art Museums.

In 1940, a group of students, who studied under Conant, formed the Society of Architectural Historians under his influence.

References

External links
Mapping Gothic France profile

1894 births
1984 deaths
People from Neenah, Wisconsin
United States Army personnel of World War I
20th-century American historians
20th-century American male writers
American architectural historians
Harvard College alumni
Harvard University faculty
Corresponding Fellows of the British Academy
American male non-fiction writers
Historians from Wisconsin
Presidents of the Archaeological Institute of America
Members of the American Philosophical Society